Alastair McLeod is a  Northern Ireland-Australian celebrity chef  He is a regular guest on Ready Steady Cook, Queensland Weekender and ABC Radio. Alastair also hosts his own food show ″Off the Eaten Track″ that has screened in Australia, Asia, and New Zealand.

Born in Belfast, Northern Ireland, he is the son of Australian singer Candy Devine.  He credits his love of cooking and food to his multicultural background of Torres Strait Islander, Sri Lankan, Danish, Filipino and Spanish ancestry.

Alastair worked in several Michelin listed restaurants in Europe, including the Roscoff in Belfast (working for Paul Rankin), and Da Giovanni restaurant in Torino, Italy, as well as other venues in Scotland and France.

He is the former executive chef of Bretts Wharf Restaurant and Tank Restaurant and Bar in Brisbane.

He now owns and runs Al'FreshCo, a Brisbane catering company.

References

External links
 Personal Website
 Al'FreshCo Website

Living people
Australian television chefs
Year of birth missing (living people)
People from Brisbane
People from Belfast
Businesspeople from Brisbane
Businesspeople from Belfast
British emigrants to Australia
Australian people of Northern Ireland descent
Australian people of Sri Lankan descent
Australian people of Danish descent
Australian people of Filipino descent
Australian people of Spanish descent
People from Northern Ireland of Australian descent
People from Northern Ireland of Sri Lankan descent
People from Northern Ireland of Danish descent
People from Northern Ireland of Filipino descent
People from Northern Ireland of Spanish descent